Fort Collinson was a trading post operated by the Hudson's Bay Company (Post Number B.405) located on Victoria Island in the Northwest Territories, Canada. It is situated on the Prince Albert Peninsula on the north side of Walker Bay, just north of Minto Inlet.

Previously known as Fort Brabant the post opened in 1928 when it was moved from its prior location at Alaervik on the north side of Prince Albert Sound.

Named in honour of Sir Richard Collinson, an English naval officer and explorer of the Arctic, the post closed in 1939 when it was transferred to Holman, now Ulukhaktok.

References

Further reading
 Condon, R.G. East meets West: Fort Collinson, the fur trade, and the economic acculturation of the northern Copper Inuit, 1928-1939.

Hudson's Bay Company forts
Ghost towns in the Northwest Territories
Buildings and structures in the Northwest Territories
Collinson
Victoria Island (Canada)
Former populated places in the Inuvik Region
1928 establishments in the Northwest Territories
1939 disestablishments in the Northwest Territories